Giro del Mendrisiotto is a road bicycle race held annually around Mendrisio, in the canton of Ticino of Switzerland. The race was an amateur competition until 1996. Since 2005, it is organized as a 1.2 event on the UCI Europe Tour.
In 2010 the race was excluded from the UCI calendar, once again becoming a national event.

Winners

External links
Velo Club Mendrisio home page

Recurring sporting events established in 1933
1933 establishments in Switzerland
UCI Europe Tour races
Cycle races in Switzerland
Spring (season) events in Switzerland